Raadhu in Mumbai, India as Radica Ranganath, is an Indian actress who has done a few Tamil-language and Malayalam-language Indian films of the eighties. Even though she had made a good name as an actress, she quit the industry to pursue a life outside films.

Career

Raadhu had a brief stint in Malayalam and Tamil films in the eighties. She started her career in Tamil with Nizhalgal  directed by Bharathiraja. After that, she acted in Ennu Nathante Nimmi with Mammootty & Rahman and the long delayed traditional Vadakkanpattu film Kadathanadan Ambadi with Mohanlal.

Soon, Radica was married, and began her work in the software industry. With the struggle of two growing kids, and pressured work, Radica, now Giri decided it was best to leave her job and pursue her deep passion in Bharathanatyman, mentored by A Lakshmanaswamy. Having already learned and performed 2 arangetrams, Radica Giri opened her very own dance studio, Anjali Natyam School of Dance. Today, she teaches over 40 students, and has successfully finished the arangetram of over a dozen and a young women. Constantly performing at rotary shows and other festivals, she hopes to instill a passion of this classical Indian dance form.

Radica Giri's maiden dance / theatre production "Chitrangada", a slice from the Mahabharata, won accolades.

Filmography
 As actress

References

External links
 

Living people
Indian film actresses
Actresses in Tamil cinema
Actresses in Malayalam cinema
20th-century Indian actresses
Year of birth missing (living people)